Long Way Down is the debut studio album by British singer-songwriter Tom Odell. It was released on 24 June 2013 and serves as the follow-up to his 2012 extended play, Songs from Another Love. It serves as his first release with a major record label, and was released with Columbia.

Background
In early 2012, Odell announced that he had signed to Columbia and began recording his debut album later on in 2012. In November 2012, Tom Odell released his first EP Songs from Another Love for which included famous hit "Another Love", which Odell released an official video on his VEVO.

Odell came in to RAK Studios in St Johns Wood with producer Dan Grech-Marguerat to record the album in the summer of 2012.

Odell announced that his first single from the album would be "Can't Pretend" which was released worldwide on March 6, 2013. It was later announced the second single to come from the album was "Hold Me". Odell performed "Hold Me" and "Can't Pretend" on both Alan Carr: Chatty Man and The Jonathan Ross Show.

In December 2012, Odell announced that the title of his debut album would be Long Way Down. In addition, he also unveiled its artwork and release date of 16 April 2013, however, due to its scheduled U.S. release date it was pushed back until 24 June 2013 to prevent the leak of the album across the rest of the world. He also announced the track listing which included "Another Love", "Can't Pretend" and "Hold Me".

Promotion
To promote the album, Odell went on two tours. The first was a smaller, mini-tour which took place in March 2013, three months before the album's release; the second tour takes place in autumn 2013. In 2012 Odell appeared as an opening act for Jake Bugg on the UK leg of his tour in November 2012.

Reception

Upon release, Long Way Down received mixed reviews from critics. On Metacritic, which assigns a rating out of 100, the album received an average score of 58 based on 14 reviews by mainstream critics.

NME gave the album 0 out of 10, prompting Odell's father to complain to the magazine.

Track listing
All tracks written by Tom Odell (except where indicated) and produced by Dan Grech-Marguerat.

Charts

Weekly charts

Year-end charts

Certifications

References

2013 debut albums
Columbia Records albums
Tom Odell albums